Jagdgeschwader 72 was a former fighter wing of the German Federal Armed Forces Luftwaffe in Cold War. It was formed on March 1, 1961 as Jagdbombergeschwader (fighter bomber wing) 36 on Fliegerhorst Nörvenich from parts of Jagdbombergeschwader 31. Since February 4, 1975, it was mainly equipped with the McDonnell Douglas F-4 Phantom II (F-4F). With the Fall of the Berlin Wall, the wing was redesignated a fighter wing (Jagdgeschwader 72) with the honorary name "Westfalen" to emphasize the bond between unit and the region it was based in.

Due to the limited capability to upgrade the Phantom F-4 at the beginning of the new millennium, the wing was dissolved in 2002.

References

Wings of the German Air Force
Fighter wings
Fighter aircraft units and formations of Germany
Military units and formations disestablished in 2002